The 86th Rifle Division was an infantry division of the Soviet Union's Red Army during the interwar period, World War II, and the early postwar period, formed twice.

Interwar period 

By an order of the Volga Military District on 23 May 1922, the 1st Kazan Separate Rifle Brigade, formed from a rifle brigade of the 16th Rifle Division and the Saransk Reserve Brigade, was reorganized as the 1st Rifle Division. It was part of the Volga Military District and on 18 October received the honorific Kazan. Most of its units were stationed in Kazan, including the 1st Kazan Rifle Regiment. The division became a territorial division in December 1923, and on 29 July 1930 it received the honorific named for the Central Executive Committee of the Tatar ASSR. On 29 May 1936, the division was renumbered as the 86th Kazan Rifle Division named for the Central Executive Committee of the Tatar ASSR. On 3 October 1939, elements of the division were used to form the 111th Rifle Division while the remaining troops, reinforced by other units, were used to form the 86th Motor Rifle Division.

Between January and March 1940 the division participated in the Winter War as part of the Leningrad Military District, for which it was awarded the Order of Red Banner before briefly returning to the Volga Military District in April. It was transferred to the Western Special Military District and stationed in Proskurov from June. On 16 July, the division's honorific named for the Central Executive Committee of the Tatar ASSR was changed to named for the Presidium of the Supreme Soviet of the Tatar ASSR, and it was converted back to a rifle division.

World War II

1st Formation
It was engaged on 22 June 1941 in border battles, being almost destroyed in the process of defending the sector of the 64th Fortified Region of the 5th Rifle Corps, 10th Army, at Tzekhanovo in the Belostock area against five Wehrmacht infantry divisions. The division was disbanded soon after, but in 1943 partisans found all the divisional standards in a hide, and the units were reinstated on the RKKA rolls.

Composition
 169th, 284th, 330th Rifle Regiments
 248th Artillery Regiment
 383rd Howitzer Regiment
 128th Anti-tank Destroyer (size?)
 342nd Anti-aircraft (size?)
 109th Reconnaissance Battalion
 120th Sapper Battalion
 95th Separate Communications Battalion
 14th Motor-rifle Battalion
 20th Auto-transport Battalion
 13th Field Bakery
 32nd Divisional Artillery Workshop
 366th Field Mail Station
 626th Field Bank

2nd Formation
The 86th Rifle Division (2nd Formation) was established at Lavrovo in September 1941 from the 4th Division of the Leningrad People's Militia Army, as part of the 7th Army. The 4th People's Militia Division was one of the better quality Leningrad provisional divisions, with men mostly having prior military service. The division fought near Leningrad in extremely difficult weather conditions at the Nevsky Pyatachok at which time it was renamed as the 86th Rifle Division. When formed it included 1st, 3rd and 4th Separate Special Rifle Brigades, 50th, 111th and 112th Separate Rifle Battalions and Special Sailor's Battalion. From January 1942 the division fought in the 8th Army sector of the Leningrad Front. The division later served in the capture of Tartu on 25 August 1944 as part of the 67th Army (3rd Baltic Front), and in East Prussia. With 2nd Shock Army of the 2nd Belorussian Front May 1945.

Post-war
The division remained part of the Group of Soviet Forces in Germany with the 2nd Shock Army's 116th Rifle Corps. In February and March 1946, the division was withdrawn to Kharkov along with the corps. The division became part of the 14th Guards Rifle Corps and in May 1946 was converted into the 17th Rifle Brigade. The brigade and its corps became part of the Kiev Military District at Dnipropetrovsk months later. In March 1947, the brigade was disbanded.

References

Citations

Bibliography 

Robert G. Poirier and Albert Z. Conner, The Red Army Order of Battle in the Great Patriotic War, Novato: Presidio Press, 1985. .

086
Military units and formations established in 1922

ru:86-я стрелковая дивизия (1-го формирования)